Rockwoods Reservation is a  state forest and wildlife conservation area in St. Louis County, Missouri. It was established in 1938, making it one of the oldest Missouri Department of Conservation areas.

Being located close to a major urban area and in a rapidly developing suburban area increases its significance as a nature reserve.  Rockwoods supports a diverse array of native plant and animal life and contains geologically interesting rock formations and ecologically important springs and caves.  Rockwoods Reservation is not a pristine wilderness untouched by human hands, however; remnants of extensive former limestone, clay and gravel quarrying operations are hidden in the dense second growth hardwood forest.  Most of the original forest was clearcut to feed lime kilns.

Rockwoods Reservation adjoins St. Louis County's  Greensfelder County Park to the south, which itself abuts the state's  Rockwoods Range Conservation Area.  Taken together, these three parcels constitute a contiguous green belt of almost .  The  Greenrock Trail is a hiking trail that crosses all three areas with one terminus in Rockwoods Reservation.

There are six trails in Rockwoods Reservation:
Wildlife Habitat Discovery Trail 
Rock Quarry Trail - 
Trail Among the Trees - 
Lime Kiln Trail - 
Green Rock Trail -  of the trail's 
Turkey Ridge Trail -

References

Conservation Areas of Missouri
Missouri state forests
Nature reserves in Missouri
Protected areas established in 1938
Protected areas of St. Louis County, Missouri
Nature centers in Missouri
1938 establishments in Missouri